Dyschirius wayah is a species of ground beetle in the subfamily Scaritinae. It was described by Dajoz in 2005.

References

wayah
Beetles described in 2005